The Adventures of Rocky and Bullwinkle and Friends is a video game released by THQ between 1992 and 1994 for Game Boy, NES, SNES, and Sega Genesis adapted from The Adventures of Rocky and Bullwinkle and Friends TV series.

Plot
In the NES version, Bullwinkle learns that his ancestor left sums of money for him to collect. Rocky and Bullwinkle need to go through perilous levels that feature their enemies Boris and Natasha, before they could reach the home of the moose's ancestor.

In the Genesis, SNES, and Game Boy versions, three artifacts are stolen from a museum. It is up to Rocky and Bullwinkle to get them back.

Gameplay
The NES version includes a countryside house, a futuristic city, a train, a desert, and a mansion. The player can switch between Rocky and Bullwinkle during a game. Bullwinkle can ram into enemies while Rocky can fly. Both characters can hurl bombs at foes.

The Genesis and SNES versions consist of seven levels that take players through various locales: A Swiss Alps-style mountain, a cavern, a mine, a submarine, a haunted ship, a port town, and a castle. Instead of bombs, the title characters hurl mooseberries and acorns at enemies. Mini-games are available at certain points that allows players to collect extra lives. The mini-games are "Peabody and Sherman", where players control Sherman and blow bubble gum bubbles to clog a dragon's mouth, and "Dudley Do-Right", where players ride a horse and avoid an ever-approaching train which is driven by Snidely Whiplash.

The Game Boy version only has three levels, although generally with multiple sections. The first level, Frostbite Falls, has the player control Bullwinkle. The second, on the Moon, uses Rocky, and the final one, the Abominable Manor, uses Bullwinkle again. Before the final section, a bonus level that has Bullwinkle running to the end of a football field to catch Rocky, avoiding and head-butting football players on the way, can grant the player an extra life upon completion. The final section has a time limit to defeat the Fearless Leader and rescue your friend. Dying three times sends the player back to the first section of the level. Despite the absence thereof, the game label still showed the "Friends" (e.g. Dudley Do-Right).

The Game Boy version's level design is the same as The Ren & Stimpy Show: Space Cadet Adventures (also developed by Imagineering).

Reception

When reviewing the NES version, GamePro stated that the slow-paced action may not appeal to experienced NES players but the absence of continues may provide an interesting challenge. The reviewer also stated that fans of the TV series might play the game for nostalgic reasons.

References

1992 video games
Absolute Entertainment games
The Adventures of Rocky and Bullwinkle and Friends video games
Game Boy games
Imagineering (company) games
Nintendo Entertainment System games
North America-exclusive video games
Platform games
Radical Entertainment games
Sega Genesis games
Single-player video games
Super Nintendo Entertainment System games
THQ games
Video games based on animated television series
Video games developed in Canada
Video games developed in the United States
Video games scored by Mark Van Hecke